The MWA World Heavyweight Championship was a professional wrestling world heavyweight championship in the Kansas City, Kansas-based Midwest Wrestling Association (MWA). It was the direct predecessor of the National Wrestling Alliance (NWA) World Heavyweight Championship, and a successor of sorts to the early world heavyweight championships. The title was created in 1940, and first held by Bobby Bruns that January.

At an unknown period, Brown won the Kansas Heavyweight Champion and had a match against 4-time World Heavyweight Champion Ed "Strangler" Lewis.
8 November 1933 Brown defeated Chief Chewchki in St. Louis, Missouri in 7 minutes. 11 April and 16 May 1934 in the same city he fought George Zaharias (of Colorado) then "Ray Steele" (Peter Sauer) to thirty-minute draws.
29 May 1936 in the Houston Post Brown was specified by Jim Londos as the strongest grappler he had ever faced, and that he had wrestled him "a few nights ago" to a two-hour draw in Detroit. 21 September 1936 Brown was named one of the top twenty contenders for the World’s Heavyweight Championship in Houston, Texas by the members of the National Wrestling Association.
1 June 1937 Bruns unsuccessfully challenged World Champion Everette Marshall at the Public Hall in Cleveland, Ohio. The match ended in 44:48 when Bruns was laid out and unable to recover.
September 1937 John Pesek was award Londos' National Wrestling Association world title.
28 October 1937 Brown lost an important Columbus, Ohio match to Everette Marshall, the recognized holder of one of the World Championships. It drew 10,000 people, setting a city record. He lost one other, but then managed to tie Marshall in a third match on 16 December.
1 January 1938 Brown wrestled Pesek to a 90-minute draw. 17 August 1938 Pesek was stripped of the NWA world title and immediately awarded the MWA world title (Marshall's old title) instead.
10 November 1939 Bruns defeated Maurice Boyer in Bridgeport, Connecticut for the World Light Heavyweight Championship (the Jack Pfeffer version).

The title lasted until the MWA joined the newly formed NWA in October 1948, with the MWA champion, Orville Brown, recognized as the first NWA World Heavyweight Champion.

Title history

MWA World Heavyweight Championship (Kansas)
Key

Reigns by combined length
Key

See also
Heart of America Sports Attractions
National Wrestling Alliance
NWA World Heavyweight Championship
List of early world heavyweight champions in professional wrestling

Footnotes

References
General references

Specific references

Heart of America Sports Attractions championships
World heavyweight wrestling championships